The American Public School Endowments, or APSE, is a national outgrowth of The Acadiana Educational Endowment, based in Lafayette, Louisiana.

APSE distributes funds generated from its nonprofit bookstore booksXYZ.com, writes grants, and seeks to build collaboration with news and Internet media, and other nonprofit organizations, to improve education across the United States.  One of its current foci is bringing Open Source technologies into schools.

Related links
The Acadiana Educational Endowment
The American Public School Endowments
booksXYZ.com

Educational organizations based in the United States